Stone is an American police drama that aired on ABC on Monday nights from January 14 until March 17, 1980. The series was a Stephen J. Cannell Productions and Gerry Productions, Inc. in association with Universal Television (it was Cannell's last series before he went independent) and was created by Cannell, Richard Levinson and William Link.

Premise
The series focused on Det Sgt. Daniel Stone, a police officer who wrote best-selling novels on police work based on his own experiences (similar to real-life cop-turned-writer Joseph Wambaugh). His superior Chief Paulton, his one-time mentor, was unhappy with Stone's writing but was unable to stop him. The role of Det. Buck Rogers was played by series star Dennis Weaver's son Robby Weaver.

Cast
 Dennis Weaver as Det. Sgt. Daniel Stone
 Pat Hingle as Chief Gene Paulton
 Robby Weaver as Det. Buck Rogers

Episodes

References

External links
 

1980 American television series debuts
1980 American television series endings
American Broadcasting Company original programming
Television series by Universal Television
Television series by Stephen J. Cannell Productions
English-language television shows
American detective television series